Olebile Marakadu Gaborone (born 1947) is a Botswanan politician who has served as the High Commissioner of Botswana to Mozambique since 2016, and formerly served in the Parliament of Botswana representing Tlokweng as apart of the Botswana National Front (2004-2009) and the Botswana Democratic Party (2010-2014). Gaborone additionally served as the Assistant Minister of Local Government and Rural Development from February 2013 to October 2014.
Gaborone graduated with a Bachelor of Arts degree in Humanities from the University of Botswana, Lesotho and Swaziland, and a Master's degree in Education from the University of Manchester.

Prior to his political career, Gaborone worked as the Chief Executive Officer for Botswana Telecommunications Corporation, as a managing director for Longman Botswana, and as a lecturer and account registrar for the University of Botswana.

References

Botswana politicians
Living people
1947 births